Dolby Live (formerly Park Theater) is an indoor amphitheater on the grounds of the Park MGM casino hotel in Las Vegas, Nevada. Opening in December 2016, the theater primarily hosts concerts and residencies and is the second-largest theater on the Las Vegas Strip. The theater sits adjacent to the T-Mobile Arena and Toshiba Plaza.

Description
The theater was announced in July 2015, as part of the mass redevelopment of the aging Monte Carlo Resort and Casino. Spearheaded by MGM Resorts International and AEG, construction began November 2, 2015 on the "MGM Resorts Theater" (later known as the "MCR Concert Hall" before settling on its current name) at the site of the former Lance Burton Theatre. After one year of construction, the $90 million theatre opened on December 17, 2016, with a concert by Stevie Nicks.

The theater boasts a capacity of 6,400 (5,200 for residency shows), making it the second largest theater on the Strip behind the Zappos Theater.

The venue is 150,000 square feet with a 135'x40' stage and 7,500 square foot proscenium arch. The theatre was designed ensuring the back row was only 145 feet from the stage. It also includes an 80'x40' 4K-LED screen.

In October 2021, the theater was renamed "Dolby Live" as part of a naming rights agreement with Dolby. As part of the agreement, the theater's sound system was upgraded to use Dolby Atmos technology.

Performance history

Headliners

Concerts

References

2016 establishments in Nevada
Music venues completed in 2016
Buildings and structures in Paradise, Nevada
Park MGM
Music venues in the Las Vegas Valley
Theatres in Nevada